Solarized is a color scheme for code editors and terminal emulators created by Ethan Schoonover. The scheme is available in a light and a dark mode. Packages that implement the color scheme have been published for many major applications, with some including the scheme pre-installed.

History 
Ethan Schoonover—a designer and software developer—began working on Solarized in 2010 after he installed a new code editor and could not find a color scheme he liked. He found the default white-on-black schemes of most applications to be too high in contrast. Even for low-contrast schemes, some colors were more prominent than others. This was an issue for programming, as code editors use syntax highlighting, where color is used to indicate the different parts of the code.

Initially, Schoonover attempted to modify the colors of another scheme called Zenburn, but he was daunted by its implementation in Vim script and did not agree with some of its design decisions. Schoonover took six months in order to research and create Solarized, with the goal of applying "design rigor". Schoonover published Solarized in April 2011 on GitHub.

Schoonover has refused offers of donations to the project, preferring to not be beholden to others regarding changes, especially since aspects of programming environments such as color schemes can be contentious. Schoonover has considered releasing a revised set of color schemes as "Solarized 2" in order to avoid legacy support issues based on the original Solarized.

Design 
Schoonover used Vim as his editor inside of a terminal, so he had to be conscious of its color limitations and decided to limit the scheme to 16 colors. He also worked on both a light and dark color scheme early on, with the goal of making them opposites of each other and cohesive. Due to Schoonover's prior experience with photography and color management, Solarized was designed in the CIELAB color space, with sRGB hex values being generated from canonical CIELAB values. Initially, Schoonover had a goal of creating a build system that would output themes for many different applications, but it proved difficult due to undocumented and complicated formats.

Schoonover first worked on Ruby and Haskell syntax highlighting to make sure their overall "typographic color" looked consistent. Schoonover had trouble getting the shade of red correct. The use of the colors yellow and blue were personal choices for Schoonover: yellow associated with "pleasant sounds, shapes, and pieces of music" due to minor synesthesia, and blue representing how he imagines drowning in the ocean to be like because of his thalassophobia. Schoonover expressed concern that ports might use an uneven mix of colors or too many colors. The light and dark schemes have symmetric CIELAB lightness differences in their base colors, preserving perceived contrast. The 16-color palette was also designed to scale down to multiple five-color palettes for design work.

Colors

Reception 
Upon release on GitHub, Solarized reached the top percentiles of projects for that week. Joel Falconer of The Next Web recommended Solarized, writing: "I doubt there are many, if any, terminal color schemes that have received the amount of thought and attention that Schoonover's Solarized has." Writing for Tidbits, Steven Aquino tested Solarized Light along with the Cousine font and reported that "as a visually impaired person, I find the combination to be extremely comfortable for my eyes. ... I'm experiencing considerably less eye strain than normal."

Gallery

See also 
 Helmholtz–Kohlrausch effect

Notes

References

External links 

 

Color schemes
Software using the MIT license
2011 software